Newbridge is a small townland in south County Londonderry, Northern Ireland. Stretching from Toomebridge in County Antrim, to Bellaghy, Castledawson, Magherafelt, and Ballymaguigan, it latter which shares the parish of Ardtrea North, St. Trea's.

Newbridge is the home to Anahorish Primary School and to Sean O'Leary's Newbridge GAC.

References

Townlands of County Londonderry